Igal Brener is an physicist at Sandia National Laboratories who was named a Fellow of the Institute of Electrical and Electronics Engineers (IEEE) in 2014 for his contributions to terahertz science and technology. Brener is also a Fellow of the American Physical Society and the Optical Society of America. He maintains active research programs in nanophotonics, metamaterials and Terahertz S&T.

Education
Brener obtained his B.Sc. in electrical engineering and physics from the Technion – Israel Institute of Technology in 1983 and in 1991 did his D.Sc. in the same field and at the same place.

References

External links

20th-century births
Living people
Israeli engineers
Technion – Israel Institute of Technology alumni
Los Alamos National Laboratory personnel
Sandia National Laboratories people
Fellow Members of the IEEE
Fellows of the American Physical Society
Fellows of Optica (society)
21st-century American engineers
Year of birth missing (living people)
Place of birth missing (living people)
American electrical engineers